The National Party of Australia, also known as The Nationals or The Nats, is a centre-right Australian political party. Traditionally representing graziers, farmers, and regional voters generally, it began as the Australian Country Party in 1920 at a federal level.  

In 1975 it adopted the name National Country Party, before taking its current name in 1982. A conservative and agrarian party, the Nationals combine social conservatism with agrarian socialist economic policies. Ensuring support for farmers, either through government grants and subsidies or through community appeals, is a major focus of National Party policy. The process for obtaining these funds has come into question in recent years, such as during the Sports Rorts Affair. According to Ian McAllister, the Nationals are the only remaining party from the "wave of agrarian socialist parties set up around the Western world in the 1920s".

Federally and to various extents in New South Wales, Victoria and Western Australia, the Nationals have been the minor party in centre-right Coalition governments with the Liberal Party; its leader has usually served as Deputy Prime Minister. In Opposition the Coalition was usually maintained, but even otherwise the party still generally continued to work in co-operation with the Liberals (as had their predecessors the Nationalist Party and United Australia Party). Due to the closeness and integration of the two parties, as well as the declining vote of the Nationals in recent years, it has been proposed several times that the Liberals and the Nationals formally merge. In Queensland, for instance, the Country Party (later National Party) was the senior coalition party between 1925 and 2008, after which it merged with the junior Liberal Party to form the Liberal National Party of Queensland.

The current leader of the National Party is David Littleproud, representing the Queensland electorate of Maranoa. He replaced Barnaby Joyce following a leadership spill in May 2022, after the Coalition's defeat in the 2022 federal election. The party's deputy leader is Perin Davey, Senator for New South Wales.

History

 

The Country Party was formally founded in 1913 in Western Australia, and nationally in 1920, from a number of state-based parties such as the Victorian Farmers' Union (VFU) and the Farmers and Settlers Party of New South Wales. Australia's first Country Party was founded in 1912 by Harry J. Stephens, editor of The Farmer & Settler, but, under fierce opposition from rival newspapers, failed to gain momentum.

The VFU won a seat in the House of Representatives at the Corangamite by-election held in December 1918, with the help of the newly introduced preferential voting system. At the 1919 federal election the state-based Country Parties won federal seats in New South Wales, Victoria and Western Australia. They also began to win seats in state parliaments. In 1920 the Country Party was established as a national party led by William McWilliams from Tasmania. In his first speech as leader, McWilliams laid out the principles of the new party, stating "we crave no alliance, we spurn no support but we intend drastic action to secure closer attention to the needs of primary producers" McWilliams was deposed as party leader in favour of Earle Page in April 1921, following instances where McWilliams voted against the party line. McWilliams later left the Country Party to sit as an Independent.

According to historian B. D. Graham (1959), the graziers who operated the sheep stations were politically conservative. They disliked the Labor Party, which represented their workers, and feared that Labor governments would pass unfavorable legislation and listen to foreigners and communists. The graziers were satisfied with the marketing organisation of their industry, opposed any change in land tenure and labour relations, and advocated lower tariffs, low freight rates, and low taxes. On the other hand, Graham reports, the small farmers, not the graziers, founded the Country party. The farmers advocated government intervention in the market through price support schemes and marketing pools. The graziers often politically and financially supported the Country party, which in turn made the Country party more conservative.

The Country Party's first election as a united party, in 1922, saw it in an unexpected position of power. It won enough seats to deny the Nationalists an overall majority. It soon became apparent that the price for Country support would be a full-fledged coalition with the Nationalists. However, Page let it be known that his party would not serve under Hughes, and forced his resignation. Page then entered negotiations with the Nationalists' new leader, Stanley Bruce, for a coalition government. Page wanted five seats for his Country Party in a Cabinet of 11, including the Treasurer portfolio and the second rank in the ministry for himself. These terms were unusually stiff for a prospective junior coalition partner in a Westminster system, and especially so for such a new party. Nonetheless, with no other politically realistic coalition partner available, Bruce readily agreed, and the "Bruce-Page Ministry" was formed. This began the tradition of the Country Party leader ranking second in Coalition cabinets.

Page remained dominant in the party until 1939, and briefly served as caretaker Prime Minister between the death of Joseph Lyons and the election of Robert Menzies as his successor. However, Page gave up the leadership rather than serve under Menzies. The coalition was re-formed under Archie Cameron in 1940, and continued until October 1941 despite the election of Arthur Fadden as leader after the 1940 election. Fadden was well regarded within conservative circles and proved to be a loyal deputy to Menzies in the difficult circumstances of 1941. When Menzies was forced to resign as Prime Minister, the UAP was so bereft of leadership that Fadden briefly succeeded him (despite the Country Party being the junior partner in the governing coalition). However, the two independents who had been propping up the government rejected Fadden's budget and brought the government down. Fadden stood down in favour of Labor leader John Curtin.

The Fadden-led Coalition made almost no headway against Curtin, and was severely defeated in the 1943 election. After that loss, Fadden became deputy Leader of the Opposition under Menzies, a role that continued after Menzies folded the UAP into the Liberal Party of Australia in 1944. Fadden remained a loyal partner of Menzies, though he was still keen to assert the independence of his party. Indeed, in the lead up to the 1949 federal election, Fadden played a key role in the defeat of the Chifley Labor government, frequently making inflammatory claims about the "socialist" nature of the Labor Party, which Menzies could then "clarify" or repudiate as he saw fit, thus appearing more "moderate". In 1949, Fadden became Treasurer in the second Menzies government and remained so until his retirement in 1958. His successful partnership with Menzies was one of the elements that sustained the coalition, which remained in office until 1972 (Menzies himself retired in 1966).

Fadden's successor, Trade Minister John McEwen, took the then unusual step of declining to serve as Treasurer, believing he could better ensure that the interests of Australian primary producers were safeguarded. Accordingly, McEwen personally supervised the signing of the first post-war trade treaty with Japan, new trade agreements with New Zealand and Britain, and Australia's first trade agreement with the USSR (1965). In addition to this, he insisted on developing an all-encompassing system of tariff protection that would encourage the development of those secondary industries that would "value add" Australia's primary produce. His success in this endeavour is sometimes dubbed "McEwenism". This was the period of the Country Party's greatest power, as was demonstrated in 1962 when McEwen was able to insist that Menzies sack a Liberal Minister who claimed that Britain's entry into the European Economic Community was unlikely to severely impact the Australian economy as a whole.

Menzies retired in 1966 and was succeeded by Harold Holt. McEwen thus became the longest-tenured member of the government, with the informal right to veto government policy. The most significant instance in which McEwen exercised this right came when Holt disappeared in December 1967. John Gorton became the new Liberal Prime Minister in January 1968. McEwen was sworn in as interim Prime Minister pending the election of the new Liberal leader. Logically, the Liberals' deputy leader, William McMahon, should have succeeded Holt. However, McMahon was a staunch free-trader, and there were also rumors that he was homosexual. As a result, McEwen told the Liberals that he and his party would not serve under McMahon. McMahon stood down in favour of John Gorton. It was only after McEwen announced his retirement that MacMahon was able to successfully challenge Gorton for the Liberal leadership. McEwen's reputation for political toughness led to him being nicknamed "Black Jack" by his allies and enemies alike.

At the state level, from 1957 to 1989, the Country Party under Frank Nicklin and Joh Bjelke-Petersen dominated governments in Queensland—for the last six of those years ruling in its own right, without the Liberals. This was due to the bjelkemander, a malapportionment in electorates which gave rural voters twice the voting power compared to voters within the city. It also took part in governments in New South Wales, Victoria, and Western Australia.

However, successive electoral redistributions after 1964 indicated that the Country Party was losing ground electorally to the Liberals as the rural population declined, and the nature of some parliamentary seats on the urban/rural fringe changed. A proposed merger with the Democratic Labor Party (DLP) under the banner of "National Alliance" was rejected when it failed to find favour with voters at the 1974 state election.

Also in 1974, the Northern Territory members of the party joined with its Liberal party members to form the independent Country Liberal Party. This party continues to represent both parent parties in that territory. A separate party, the Joh-inspired NT Nationals, competed in the 1987 election with former Chief Minister Ian Tuxworth winning his seat of Barkly by a small margin. However, this splinter group was not endorsed by the national executive and soon disappeared from the political scene.

National Country Party and National Party 
The National Party was confronted by the impact of demographic shifts from the 1970s: between 1971 and 1996, the population of Sydney and surrounds grew by 34%, with even larger growth in coastal New South Wales, while more remote rural areas grew by a mere 13%, further diminishing the National Party's base. On 2 May 1975 at the federal convention in Canberra, the Country Party changed its name to the National Country Party of Australia as part of a strategy to expand into urban areas. This had some success in Queensland under Joh Bjelke-Petersen, but nowhere else. The party briefly walked out of the coalition agreement in Western Australia in May 1975, returning within the month. However, the party split in two over the decision and other factors in late 1978, with a new National Party forming and becoming independent, holding three seats in the Western Australian lower house, while the National Country Party remained in coalition and also held three seats. They reconciled after the Burke Labor government came to power in 1983.

The 1980s were dominated by the feud between Bjelke-Petersen and the federal party leadership. Bjelke-Petersen briefly triumphed in 1987, forcing the Nationals to tear up the Coalition agreement and support his bid to become Prime Minister.  The "Joh for Canberra" campaign backfired spectacularly when a large number of three-cornered contests allowed Labor to win a third term under Bob Hawke; however, in 1987 the National Party won a bump in votes and recorded its highest vote in more than four decades, but it also recorded a new low in the proportion of seats won. The collapse of Joh for Canberra also proved to be the Queensland Nationals' last hurrah; Bjelke-Petersen was forced into retirement a few months after the federal election, and his party was heavily defeated in 1989. The federal National Party were badly defeated at the 1990 election, with leader Charles Blunt one of five MPs to lose his seat.

Blunt's successor as leader, Tim Fischer, recovered two seats at the 1993 election, but lost an additional 1.2% of the vote from its 1990 result. In 1996, as the Coalition won a significant victory over the Keating Labor government, the National Party recovered another two seats, and Fischer became Deputy Prime Minister under John Howard.

The Nationals experienced difficulties in the late 1990s from two fronts – firstly from the Liberal Party, who were winning seats on the basis that the Nationals were not seen to be a sufficiently separate party, and from the One Nation Party riding a swell of rural discontent with many of the policies such as multiculturalism and gun control embraced by all of the major parties. The rise of Labor in formerly safe National-held areas in rural Queensland, particularly on the coast, has been the biggest threat to the Queensland Nationals.

At the 1998 Federal election, the National Party recorded only 5.3% of the vote in the House of Representatives, its lowest ever, and won only 16 seats, at 10.8% its second lowest proportion of seats.

The National Party under Fischer and his successor, John Anderson, rarely engaged in public disagreements with the Liberal Party, which weakened the party's ability to present a separate image to rural and regional Australia. In 2001 the National Party recorded its second-worst result at 5.6% winning 13 seats, and its third lowest at 5.9% at the 2004 election, winning only 12 seats.

Australian psephologist Antony Green argues that two important trends have driven the National Party's decline at a federal level: "the importance of the rural sector to the health of the nation's economy" and "the growing chasm between the values and attitudes of rural and urban Australia". Green has suggested that the result has been that "Both have resulted in rural and regional voters demanding more of the National Party, at exactly the time when its political influence has declined. While the National Party has never been the sole representative of rural Australia, it is the only party that has attempted to paint itself as representing rural voters above all else",

In June 2005 party leader John Anderson announced that he would resign from the ministry and as Leader of the Nationals due to a benign prostate condition, he was succeeded by Mark Vaile. At the following 2007 election, the Nationals vote declined further, with the party winning a mere 5.4% of the vote and securing only 10 seats. Vaile announced his resignation as party leader which surprised his colleagues, as he had been expected to be re-elected unopposed following the election. He had planned the party leadership to go to Peter McGauran but the latter declined to stand. Warren Truss and Nigel Scullion were then elected unopposed as leader and deputy leader.

In 2010, under the leadership of Truss, the party received its lowest vote to date, at only 3.4%, however they secured a slight increase in seats from 10 to 12. At the following election in 2010 the national Party's fortunes improved slightly with a vote of 4.2% and an increase in seats from 12 to 15.

At the 2016 double dissolution election, under the leadership of Barnaby Joyce the party secured 4.6% of the vote and 16 seats. In 2018, reports emerged that the National Party leader and Deputy Prime Minister, Barnaby Joyce was expecting a child with his former communications staffer Vikki Campion. Joyce resigned after revelations that he had been engaged in an extramarital affair. Later in the same year it was revealed that the NSW National party and its youth wing, the Young Nationals had been infiltrated by neo-Nazis with more than 30 members being investigated for alleged links to neo-Nazism. Leader McCormack denounced the infiltration, and several suspected neo-Nazis were expelled from the party and its youth wing.

At the 2019 Australian federal election, despite severe drought, perceived inaction over the plight of the Murray–Darling Basin, a poor performance in the New South Wales state election and sex scandals surrounding the member for Mallee, Andrew Broad and former party leader Barnaby Joyce, the National Party saw only a small decline in vote, down 0.10% to attain 4.51% of the primary vote.

State and territory parties 
The official state and territorial party organisations (or equivalents) of the National Party are:

Political role

The Nationals see their main role as giving a voice to Australians who live outside the country's metropolitan areas.

Traditionally, the leader of the National Party serves as Deputy Prime Minister when the Coalition is in government. This tradition dates back to the creation of the office in 1968.

The National Party's support base and membership are closely associated with the agricultural community. Historically anti-union, the party has vacillated between state support for primary industries ("agrarian socialism") and free agricultural trade and has opposed tariff protection for Australia's manufacturing and service industries. It is usually in favor of industrial development, opposing green politics.

"Countrymindedness" was a slogan that summed up the ideology of the Country Party from 1920 through the early 1970s. It was an ideology that was physiocratic, populist, and decentralist; it fostered rural solidarity and justified demands for government subsidies. "Countrymindedness" grew out of the failure of the country areas to participate in the rapid economic and population expansions that occurred after 1890. The growth of the ideology into urban areas came as most country people migrated to jobs in the cities. Its decline was due mainly to the reduction of real and psychological differences between country and city brought about by the postwar expansion of the Australian urban population and to the increased affluence and technological changes that accompanied it.

The Nationals vote is in decline and its traditional supporters are turning instead to prominent independents such as Bob Katter, Tony Windsor and Peter Andren in Federal Parliament and similar independents in the Parliaments of New South Wales, Queensland and Victoria, many of whom are former members of the National Party. In fact since the 2004 Federal election, National Party candidates have received fewer first preference votes than the Australian Greens.

Demographic changes are not helping, with fewer people living and employed on the land or in small towns, the continued growth of the larger provincial centres, and, in some cases, the arrival of left-leaning "city refugees" in rural areas. The Liberals have also gained support as the differences between the coalition partners on a federal level have become invisible. This was highlighted in January 2006, when Nationals Senator Julian McGauran defected to the Liberals, saying that there was "no longer any real distinguishing policy or philosophical difference".

In Queensland, Nationals leader Lawrence Springborg advocated merger of the National and Liberal parties at a state level in order to present a more effective opposition to the Labor Party. Previously this plan had been dismissed by the Queensland branch of the Liberal party, but the idea received in-principle support from the Liberals. Federal leader Mark Vaile stated the Nationals will not merge with the Liberal Party at a federal level. The plan was opposed by key Queensland Senators Ron Boswell and Barnaby Joyce, and was scuttled in 2006. After suffering defeat in the 2006 Queensland poll, Lawrence Springborg was replaced by Jeff Seeney, who indicated he was not interested in merging with the Liberal Party until the issue is seriously raised at a Federal level.

In September 2008, Joyce replaced CLP Senator and Nationals deputy leader Nigel Scullion as leader of the Nationals in the Senate, and stated that his party in the upper house would no longer necessarily vote with their Liberal counterparts in the upper house, which opened up another possible avenue for the Rudd Labor Government to get legislation through. Joyce was elected leader in a party-room ballot on 11 February 2016, following the retirement of former leader and Deputy Prime Minister Warren Truss. Joyce was one of five politicians disqualified from parliament in October 2017 for holding dual citizenship, along with former deputy leader, Fiona Nash.

Queensland Liberal/National merger

Merger plans came to a head in May 2008, when the Queensland state Liberal Party gave an announcement not to wait for a federal blueprint but instead to merge immediately. The new party, the Liberal National Party, was founded in July 2008.

Electoral results

Leadership

List of leaders

List of deputy leaders

List of Senate leaders
The Country Party's first senators began their terms in 1926, but the party had no official leader in the upper chamber until 1935. Instead, the party nominated a "representative" or "liaison officer" where necessary – usually William Carroll. This was so that its members "were first and foremost representatives of their states, able to enjoy complete freedom of action and speech in the Senate and not beholden to the dictates of [...] a party Senate leader". On 3 October 1935, Charles Hardy was elected as Carroll's replacement and began using the title "Leader of the Country Party in the Senate". This usage was disputed by Carroll and Bertie Johnston, but a subsequent party meeting on 10 October confirmed Hardy's position. However, after Hardy's term ended in 1938 (due to his defeat at the 1937 election), the party did not elect another Senate leader until 1949 – apparently due to its small number of senators.

Past premiers

Queensland

Victoria

Donors 

For the 2015–2016 financial year, the top ten disclosed donors to the National Party were: Manildra Group ($182,000), Ognis Pty Ltd ($100,000), Trepang Services ($70,000), Northwake Pty Ltd ($65,000), Hancock Prospecting ($58,000), Bindaree Beef ($50,000), Mowburn Nominees ($50,000), Retail Guild of Australia ($48,000), CropLife International ($43,000) and Macquarie Group ($38,000).

The National Party also receives undisclosed funding through several methods, such as "associated entities". John McEwen House, Pilliwinks and Doogary are entities which have been used to funnel donations to the National Party without disclosing the source.

See also

 Young Nationals (Australia)
 Leader of the New South Wales National Party
 Katter's Australian Party
 National Party of Australia leadership spill, 2007

Further reading
Aitkin, Don. The country party in New South Wales (1972)
Aitkin, Don. "'Countrymindedness': The Spread of an Idea", ACH: The Journal of the History of Culture in Australia, April 1985, Vol. 4, pp 34–41
 Davey, Paul. The Nationals: the Progressive, Country, and National Party in New South Wales 1919–2006 (2006)
 Davey, Paul. "Politics in the Blood – The Anthonys of Richmond" (2008)
 Davey, Paul. "Ninety Not Out – The Nationals 1920-2010" (2010)
 Davey, Paul. "The Country Party Prime Ministers – Their Trials and Tribulations" (2011)
 Duncan, C.J. "The demise of 'countrymindedness': New players or changing values in Australian rural politics?" Political Geography, Sep 1992, Vol. 11 Issue 5, pp 430–448
 Graham, B. D. "Graziers in Politics, 1917 To 1929", Historical Studies: Australia and New Zealand, 1959, Vol. 8 Issue 32, pp 383–391
 Leithner, Christian.  "Rational Behaviour, Economic Conditions and the Australian Country Party, 1922–1937", Australian Journal of Political Science, July 1991, Vol. 26 Issue 2, pp 240–259
 Williams, John R. "The Organization of the Australian National Party", Australian Quarterly, 1969, Vol. 41 Issue 2, pp 41–51,

Notes

References

 
Political parties established in 1920
Conservative parties in Australia
Agrarian parties in Australia
1920 establishments in Australia